Soldier of Love or Soldiers of Love may refer to:

 "Soldier of Love" (Donny Osmond song), a 1989 single by Donny Osmond
 Soldier of Love (album), a 2010 album by Sade
 "Soldier of Love" (Sade song), the lead single by Sade from the album Soldier of Love
 "Soldier of Love (Lay Down Your Arms)", 1962 song originally by Arthur Alexander, covered by The Beatles, Marshall Crenshaw and Pearl Jam
 "Soldier of Love", song by Brant Bjork and the Low Desert Punk Band from their 2014 album Black Power Flower
"Soldiers of Love" (Lighthouse X song), 2016
"Soldiers of Love" (Liliane Saint-Pierre song), 1987
"Soldier of Love (Lay Down Your Arms)", 1962

See also
"Purple Hearts (Soldier of Love)", CeeLo Green song from his 2015 album Heart Blanche